Protected Natural Area may refer to:

 Mexican Protected Natural Areas
 Areas that are part of the Protected Natural Areas Programme in New Zealand
 A type of conservation area in  New Brunswick

See also
Protected area